Joe Parkin is a US-born cyclist who, at the suggestion of Bob Roll, moved to Belgium in 1985 at the age of 19 to race professionally. After six years as a journeyman European pro, competing is such events as Paris–Roubaix and Tour DuPont for such teams as Tulip, he moved back to the US, rode for the Coors Lite, and turned to mountain bike racing in 1995. He now works as editor for cycling magazines. He has written two books about his racing career: A Dog in a Hat and Come and Gone. He witnessed and speaks about the early days of EPO use in professional cycling.

References

External links
Joe Parkin's fan card from 1988
A Dog in a Hat
Come and Gone
Pezcyclingnews interview by Matt Wood of Joe Parkin, author of the book: Come & Gone

American male cyclists
Living people
American mountain bikers
Cycling writers
Year of birth missing (living people)